Free at Last may refer to:

Music

Albums 
 Free at Last (DC Talk album), 1992
 Free at Last: Extended Play Remixes, 1994
 Free at Last: The Movie, a 2002 documentary about the release of the DC Talk album
 Free at Last (Free album)
 Free at Last (Freeway album)
 Free at Last (Mal Waldron album)
 Free at Last (Stretch Arm Strong album)
 Free at Last (Yukmouth album), 2010

Songs 
 "Free at Last", a Negro spiritual quoted by Rev. Martin Luther King, Jr. in his famous 1963 "I Have a Dream" speech
 "Free at Last", a song by Al Green from the album Livin' for You
 "Free at Last", a song by Joan Baez from the album Honest Lullaby
 "Free at Last", a song by G. Love & Special Sauce from Electric Mile
 "Free at Last", a song from the musical Big River
 "Free at Last", a song by Antony and the Johnsons from the album I Am a Bird Now
 "Free at Last", a song by Future from the mixtape 56 Nights
 "Free at Last", a song by Lee Moses from the album Time and Place

Literature 
 Free at Last, a book by E. E. Cleveland
 Free at Last, a book by Daniel Greenberg about the Sudbury Valley School
 Free at Last: A Documentary History of Slavery, Emancipation, and the Civil War, a book by Barbara J. Fields

Other uses 
 "I Have a Dream", a 1963 speech by Martin Luther King, Jr. that concludes "Free at last! Free at last! Thank God Almighty, we are free at last!"
 "Free at Last", a section of James Furman's oratorio I Have a Dream, based on Dr. King's speech
 Free at Last, the 2002 theme of the Next Wave Festival, Melbourne, Australia
 Free at Last (horse), a Thoroughbred racehorse, the 1991 Canadian Champion Two-Year-Old Colt
 Free at Last, a Thoroughbred racehorse, dam of Coretta